Santiago Miguel Montelli (born 3 May 1988) is an Argentine field hockey player who plays as a forward for Belgian Hockey League club Royal Daring.

At the 2012 Summer Olympics, he competed for the national team in the men's tournament.

Club career
Montelli played in Argentina for Lomas. On 7 July 2010, it was announced he would join the Waterloo Ducks in the Belgian Hockey League for the 2010–11 season. He left the Waterloo Ducks after one season. From 2014 until 2016 he played for Taburiente in Spain. In 2017 he returned to Spain to play for Tenis. He left Tenis in 2019 to play for Leuven in Belgium. After one season at Leuven he returned for one year to Spain to play for Linia 22. In 2021 he returned to Belgium and joined Royal Daring.

References

External links
 

1988 births
Living people
Argentine male field hockey players
Male field hockey forwards
Field hockey players at the 2012 Summer Olympics
Olympic field hockey players of Argentina
People from Adrogué
Waterloo Ducks H.C. players
KHC Leuven players
División de Honor de Hockey Hierba players
Men's Belgian Hockey League players
Sportspeople from Buenos Aires Province
Royal Daring players
21st-century Argentine people